Hallelujah the Hills (1963) was written, directed and edited by Adolfas Mekas.  The picture was his first feature film.

In 1963, after screenings in the Cannes Festival Critics’ section, the Montreal International Film Festival, and the Locarno Festival, where it won the Silver Sail, Hallelujah the Hills made its US debut at the First New York Film Festival at Lincoln Center on September 14, 1963.  It received rave reviews and went on to a 15-week engagement at the 5th Avenue Cinema in New York, and movie theaters around the country.  It is available in 16mm and 35mm from Anthology Film Archives and the Museum of Modern Art.

See also
List of American films of 1963

References

External links
 Hallelujah Editions (official website)
 
 Chicago Tribune Article
 AdolfasMekas.com

1960s romance films
1963 films
American romance films
1960s English-language films
1960s American films